Alternate U.S. Highway 281 (Alt. US 281) is a spur of the U.S. Highway System.

Route description
Alt. The highway enters the town and crosses FM 99 before leaving. Just north of Whitsett, the highway turns from a northwesterly direction to a more northward one. The highway passes by many farms before entering Atascosa County. After the intersection with FM 1099, the highway enters Campbellton. Alt. US 281 is concurrent with FM 791 through the town before separating just north of the city limits. About a mile to the north of here, the highway crosses FM 140. Alt.

History
The highway was created in 1982 when US 281 was re-rerouted a few miles to the east onto Interstate 37. The old alignment of US 281 through Whitsett and Campbellton was then resigned as Alt. US 281.

Major intersections

See also

References

External links

Transportation in Live Oak County, Texas
Transportation in Atascosa County, Texas
Alternate (Texas)
81-2 Alternate (Texas)
80-2 Alternate